Kulikulinga is a newly created town council in Yumbe District

It's located on  along the Yumbe Obongi Arua road south of Yumbe Municipality which is larger town in the District.

References 

Populated places in Northern Region, Uganda
West Nile sub-region
Yumbe District